Drasteria langi is a moth of the family Erebidae. It is found in Afghanistan, Kyrghyzstan, Kazakhstan and Tadjikistan.

References

Drasteria
Moths described in 1874
Moths of Asia